Lascăr Catargiu ( or Lascăr Catargi; 1 November 1823 – ) was a Romanian conservative statesman born in Moldavia. He belonged to an ancient Wallachian family, one of whose members had been banished in the 17th century by Prince Matei Basarab, and had settled in Moldavia.

Biography
Born in Iași, Lascăr Catargiu rose to the office of prefect of police in the city under the rule of the Moldavian Prince Grigore Ghica  (1849–1856). In 1857 he became a member of the ad hoc Divan of Moldavia, a commission elected in accordance with the Treaty of Paris (1856) to vote on the proposed union of Moldavia and Wallachia (the Danubian Principalities). His strongly conservative views, especially on land reform, induced the Conservatives to support him as a candidate for the Romanian throne in 1859.

During the reign of Domnitor Alexandru Ioan Cuza (1859–1866), Catargiu was one of the Opposition leaders, and received much assistance from his kinsman, Barbu Catargiu (b. 1807), a noted journalist and politician, who was assassinated in Bucharest on the June 20, 1862. Lascăr Catargiu consequently took part in the so-called monstrous coalition that toppled Cuza, and, on the accession of Domnitor Carol I in May 1866, became President of the Council of Ministers but, finding himself unable to cooperate with his Liberal colleagues, Ion Brătianu and C. A. Rosetti, he resigned in July.

After eight more ministerial changes, culminating in the anti-dynastic agitation of 1870–1871 (provoked by the Liberals in the context of the Franco-Prussian War; see also Republic of Ploiești), Catargiu formed, for the first time in Romanian history, a stable Conservative cabinet, which lasted until 1876. His policy, which averted political violence and revived the popularity of the crown, was regarded as unpatriotic and reactionary by the Liberals, who resumed office in 1876; and a proposal to impeach the whole Catargiu cabinet was only withdrawn in 1878.

Catargiu remained in opposition until 1889, when he formed another cabinet, taking the portfolio of the Interior; but this administration fell after seven months. In the Ion Emanuel Florescu cabinet of March 1891 he occupied the same position, and in December he again became president of the Council, retaining office until 1895. During this period he was responsible for several important reforms, chiefly financial and commercial. He died in Bucharest.

References

1823 births
1899 deaths
Politicians from Iași
Conservative Party (Romania, 1880–1918) politicians
Prime Ministers of Romania
Romanian Ministers of Defence
Romanian Ministers of Foreign Affairs
Romanian Ministers of Interior
Members of the Ad hoc Divans
Presidents of the Chamber of Deputies (Romania)
Members of the Senate of Romania